Qinfeng is a town in Xinzhou District, Shangrao, Jiangxi, China. Prior to 2016 it was known as Qinfeng Township.

References

Township-level divisions of Jiangxi
Shangrao